Tsakoni is a village in Kastoria Regional Unit, Macedonia, Greece.

The Greek census (1920) recorded 354 people in the village and in 1923 there were 200 inhabitants (or 40 families) who were Muslim. Following the Greek-Turkish population exchange, in 1926 within Tsakoni there were 10 refugee families from Asia Minor and 18 refugee families from Pontus. The Greek census (1928) recorded 341 village inhabitants. There were 26 refugee families (106 people) in 1928.

References

Populated places in Kastoria (regional unit)